Luc Marie Bernard Oursel, (7 September 1959 – 3 December 2014), was the former chairman of the board of the nuclear company Areva and member of its executive committee. He resigned on 20 October 2014 for health reasons. Until June 2013, he was the President of the French Nuclear Energy Corporation. In 2010, he was made a Knight Commander of the French Legion of Honour

He died on 3 December 2014.

Education
After having studied at the Lycée Janson de Sailly in Paris, Luc Oursel graduated from the École nationale supérieure des mines de Paris as a mining engineer.

References

1959 births
2014 deaths
Lycée Janson-de-Sailly alumni
Mines Paris - PSL alumni
Corps des mines
French chief executives
French civil engineers
Chevaliers of the Légion d'honneur
Schneider Electric people
Areva people